Professor Dame Linda Partridge  (born 18 March 1950) is a British geneticist, who studies the biology and genetics of ageing (biogerontology) and age-related diseases, such as Alzheimer's disease and Parkinson's disease. Partridge is currently Weldon Professor of Biometry at the Institute of Healthy Ageing, Research Department of Genetics, Evolution and Environment, University College London, and Founding Director of the Max Planck Institute for the Biology of Ageing in Cologne, Germany.

Education
Partridge was educated at the Convent of the Sacred Heart School in Tunbridge Wells and the University of Oxford from which she was awarded Master of Arts and Doctor of Philosophy degrees.

Career 
After completing her DPhil at the University of Oxford, Partridge became a NERC post-doctoral fellow at the University of York, and in 1976 moved to the University of Edinburgh where she became Professor of Evolutionary Biology. In 1994 she moved to University College London (UCL) as Weldon Professor of Biometry, and was the Director of the Institute of Healthy Ageing between 2007 and 2019. In 2008 Partridge became a Director in the Max Planck Society and the Founding Director of the Max Planck Institute for Biology of Ageing in Cologne, Germany.

Awards
Partridge was elected a Fellow of the Royal Society in 1996 and appointed Commander of the Order of the British Empire (CBE) in 2003. Her husband, Michael J. Morgan was also elected FRS in 2005. She was elected to the Academy of Medical Sciences in 2004, and awarded the Linnean Society of London's prestigious Darwin-Wallace Medal in 2008. In 2009, she was appointed Dame Commander of the Order of the British Empire (DBE), and received the Croonian Lectureship from the Royal Society.

In March 2009, the UKRC announced Dame Linda as one of six Women of Outstanding Achievement in Science, Engineering and Technology.
 
She was awarded Foreign Honorary Membership of the American Academy of Arts and Sciences in 2010.

She has been awarded Honorary Degrees (DSc) from the University of St Andrews (2004), the University of Oxford (2011), the University of Bath (2011), the University of Brighton (2012), the University of Kent (2017), the University of Edinburgh (2017), Imperial College London (2019), and the University of East Anglia (2019).

References

External links 

 

Living people
Biogerontologists
Female Fellows of the Royal Society
Dames Commander of the Order of the British Empire
British geneticists
1950 births
Place of birth missing (living people)
Alumni of St Anne's College, Oxford
Alumni of Wolfson College, Oxford
Fellows of the Royal Society of Edinburgh
Academics of University College London
People from Royal Tunbridge Wells
Fellows of the Academy of Medical Sciences (United Kingdom)
Fellows of the Royal Society
Women medical researchers
Women geneticists